Diazona is  a genus of tunicates in the family Diazonidae.

Species 
The genus Diazona has 12 recognized species:
 Diazona angulata Monniot F. & Monniot C., 1996
 Diazona carnosa Monniot F. & Monniot C., 1996
 Diazona chinensis (Tokioka, 1955)
 Diazona formosa Monniot F. & Monniot C., 1996
 Diazona fungia Monniot F. & Monniot C., 2001
 Diazona geayi Caullery, 1914
 Diazona grandis (Oka, 1926)
 Diazona labyrinthea Monniot F. & Monniot C., 1996
 Diazona pedunculata Monniot F. & Monniot C., 2001
 Diazona tenera Monniot F. & Monniot C., 1996
 Diazona textura Monniot C., 1987
 Diazona violacea Savigny, 1816

References 

Enterogona
Tunicate genera
Taxa named by Marie Jules César Savigny